Conus inconstans is a species of sea snail, a marine gastropod mollusk in the family Conidae, the cone snails and their allies.

Like all species within the genus Conus, these snails are predatory and venomous. They are capable of "stinging" humans, therefore live ones should be handled carefully or not at all.

Description
The size of the shell varies between 22 mm and 28 mm.

Distribution
This species occurs in the Caribbean Sea off Panama.

References

 Smith, E. A. 1877. Descriptions of new species of Conidae and Terebridae. Ann. Mag. nat. Hist. (4) 19: 222–231
 Puillandre N., Duda T.F., Meyer C., Olivera B.M. & Bouchet P. (2015). One, four or 100 genera? A new classification of the cone snails. Journal of Molluscan Studies. 81: 1–23

External links
 

inconstans
Gastropods described in 1877